The Sheriff of Lanark or Sheriff of Lanarkshire was historically the royal official responsible for enforcing law and order and bringing criminals to justice in Lanarkshire, Scotland. Prior to 1748 most sheriffdoms were held on a hereditary basis. From that date, following the Jacobite uprising of 1745, the hereditary sheriffs were replaced by salaried sheriff-deputes, qualified advocates who were members of the Scottish Bar.

The sheriffdom of Lanarkshire was dissolved in 1975 when it was replaced by the current sheriffdom of South Strathclyde, Dumfries and Galloway.

Sheriffs of Lanarkshire

Baldwin of Biggar (1154)
Waldeve of Biggar (1170s)
Hugh, son of Sir Reginald (ca.1196-1200)
William de Hertisheved (1225)
Richard de Coulter (1226)
Alexander Uvieth (Oviot) (1266)
Nicholas de Biggar (1273-1278)
Hugh de Dalzell (1288-1290)
Hugh de Balliol (1290)
Henry St Clair (1293)
Godfrey de Ros (1294)
Andrew Livingstone (1295-1296)
William Heselrig  (1296-1297)(assassinated by William Wallace)
Walter Logan (1301)
Walter de Burghdon (1302)
Robert de Brus (1303)
Magnus de Stratherne - 1303 - Deputy
Nicholas de Benhathe - 1303 - Deputy
Henry St Clair (1305)
William Fleming
Robert de Barde (1329)
William Douglas (c. 1345)
William Livingston (1359)
Robert Dalzell (1360)
James Lindsay (1373)
Hugh Aldistoun - 1373 - Deputy
William Newbyggyng (1387)
William Somerville - 1387 - Deputy 
Thomas Fitzmartin - 1387 - Deputy
James Douglas of Bavany (1432)
Hugh Douglas, Earl of Ormonde (1454)
James Hamilton, 1st Lord Hamilton (1470)
Archibald Douglas, 5th Earl of Angus (1489)
James Livingstone
John Speddy (c. 1552)
 William Douglas, Duke of Hamilton (1683)
 George Sinclair, Lord Woodhall (1747-1764?)

Sheriffs-Depute (1748)
Robert Sinclair, 1775–1786 
Sir William Honyman, 1st Baronet, 1786–1797 
 Robert Hamilton, 1797–1822 
William Rose Robinson, 1822–1834 
Archibald Alison, 1834–1867 
Henry Glassford Bell, 1867–1874 
William Gillespie Dickson, 1874–1876 
Francis William Clark, 1876–1886
Robert Berry, 1886–1903 
William Guthrie, 1903–
Alastair Oswald Morison Mackenzie, 1917-1933
Sir Archibald Campbell Black, KC, 1937–1952 
Sir Robert Henry Sherwood Calver, QC, 1952– 
Sir Allan Grierson Walker, QC, 1963–74 

 Sheriffdom replaced in 1975 by the sheriffdom of South Strathclyde, Dumfries and Galloway.

See also
 Historical development of Scottish sheriffdoms

References

Lanark